The Athens University Museum is a museum in Plaka, Athens, Greece.

The building was a structure of the Ottoman period but fundamentally restructured between 1831 and 1833 by Stamatios Kleanthis and Eduard Schaubert for their architectural office. From 1837 to 1841 it housed the newly founded University of Athens.

External links
Official site
City of Athens

Museums in Athens
National and Kapodistrian University of Athens
University museums in Greece
1987 establishments in Greece